Stadion am Lotter Kreuz is a multi-use stadium in Lotte, Germany.  It is currently used mostly for football matches and is the home stadium of Sportfreunde Lotte.  The stadium currently has a capacity of 10,059 spectators and opened in 1929.

Gallery

External links
Venue information

Football venues in Germany
Sports venues in North Rhine-Westphalia
Buildings and structures in Steinfurt (district)
Sportfreunde Lotte